Marshall Islands–Turkey relations are foreign relations between the Marshall Islands and Turkey. The Turkish ambassador in Canberra, Australia is also accredited to the Marshall Islands. The Marshall Islands has an Honorary Consulate in Istanbul.

Diplomatic Relations 
Turkey and the Marshall Islands have friendly relations. Turkey supported the Marshall Islands’s admittance to the UN with Resolution 704.

"Joint Statement on the Establishment of Diplomatic Relations between the Republic of Turkey and the Republic of Marshall Islands" was signed on April 9, 2008, by Turkish Foreign Minister Ali Babacan and Marshall Islands Foreign Minister Tony deBrum, on the sidelines of the Turkey-Pacific Islands Foreign Ministers Meeting held in Istanbul.

Marshall Islands Foreign Minister Tony deBrum attended the Pacific Small Island Developing States Meeting of Foreign Ministers held in Istanbul on 7-8 June 2014. On the sidelines of the meeting, “Memorandum of Understanding on Cooperation between the Ministries of Foreign Affairs of Turkey and Marshall Islands” and the “Memorandum of Understanding on Cooperation between Turkey and Marshall Islands on Diplomatic Education, Exchange of Information and Documents” were signed.

Recently, Turkey intervened on behalf of the Marshall Islands on April 28, 2015 when the Iranian navy seized the Marshall Island-flagged MV Maersk Tigris near the Strait of Hormuz. Turkey was crucial in getting the 34 crew members of the MV Maersk Tigris released.

Presidential Visits

Economic Relations 
 Trade volume between the two countries was negligible in 2018. Commercial relations between the two countries are carried out especially through the maritime sector. In recent years, the Marshall Islands have come to the fore in the flag of convenience preference of Turkish shipowners.

See also 

 Foreign relations of Marshall Islands
 Foreign relations of Turkey

References 

Bilateral relations of Turkey
Turkey